This was the second edition of the tournament in the 2021 tennis season. Lloyd Glasspool and Harri Heliövaara were the defending champions but lost in the quarterfinals to Enzo Couacaud and Manuel Guinard.

Couacaud and Guinard won the title after defeating Javier Barranco Cosano and Eduard Esteve Lobato 6–1, 6–4 in the final.

Seeds

Draw

References

External links
 Main draw

Gran Canaria Challenger II - Doubles